is a female Japanese runner who won second place at the 2009 Summer Universiade Women's half marathon event.

References

Japanese female long-distance runners
Universiade medalists in athletics (track and field)
1989 births
Living people
Place of birth missing (living people)
Universiade silver medalists for Japan
Medalists at the 2009 Summer Universiade